Amaral's blind snake (Trilepida koppesi) is a species of snake in the family Leptotyphlopidae. The species is native to South America.

Etymology
The specific name, koppesi, is in honor of S.J. Koppes, who collected the holotype in 1934.

Geographic range
Trilepida koppesi is endemic to Brazil, where it is found in the Distrito Federal and in the Brazilian states of Bahia, Goiás, and Mato Grosso.

Reproduction
Trilepida koppesi is oviparous.

References

Further reading
Adalsteinsson SA, Branch WR, Trape S, Vitt LJ, Hedges SB (2009). "Molecular phylogeny, classification, and biogeography of snakes of the family Leptotyphlopidae (Reptilia, Squamata)". Zootaxa 2244: 1-50. (Tricheilostoma koppesi, new combination).
Amaral A (1955). "Contribução ao conhecimento dos ofídios neotrópicos: 14. Descrição de duas espécies de "cobra-cega" (fam. Leptotyphlopidae) [= Contribution to the knowledge of the neotropical snakes: 14. Description of two species of "blindsnake" (family Leptotyphlopidae)]". Memórias do Instituto Butantan, São Paulo 26: 203-205. (Leptotyphlops koppesi, new species). (in Portuguese).
Hedges SB (2011). "The type species of the threadsnake genus Tricheilostoma Jan revisited (Squamata, Leptotyphlopidae)". Zootaxa 3027: 63-64. (Trilepida koppesi, new combination, p. 63).

Trilepida
Reptiles described in 1955